The 2022 Asian Judo Championships was held from 4 to 7 August 2022 at the "Zhaksylyk Ushkempirov Martial Art Palace" in Nur-Sultan, Kazakhstan. The last day of competition featured a mixed team event.

Medal summary
Source:

Men

Women

Mixed

Medal table

References

External links
 

Asian Judo Championships
Asian Championships
Asian Judo Championships
International sports competitions hosted by Kazakhstan
Asian Judo Championships
Asian 2022
Sport in Astana